Chascotheca neopeltandra is a species of plants in the family Phyllanthaceae described as a species in 1904. It is native to the western Caribbean (Cuba, Hispaniola, Cayman Islands).

References

Phyllanthaceae
Flora of the Cayman Islands
Flora of Cuba
Flora of the Dominican Republic
Flora of Haiti
Plants described in 1904
Flora without expected TNC conservation status